Heather Raffo (born in Michigan, United States) is a Lucille Lortel Award-winning Assyrian American playwright and actress, best known for her leading role in the one-woman play 9 Parts of Desire.

Biography

Early life
Her father is Assyrian and a civil engineer and her mother is American, who are both of Christian faith. Heather is a Roman Catholic who grew up in Okemos, Michigan. Heather holds a BA from the University of Michigan, an MFA from the University of San Diego and she also studied at the Royal Academy of Dramatic Art in London. Having been born in the United States, she and her family visited Iraq in 1974 when she was a little girl and again in 1993.

Raffo credits Ntozake Shange as her most significant artistic influence and has noted her as an inspiration to writing her own work after reading For Colored Girls Who Have Considered Suicide When the Rainbow Is Enuf.

Career

Heather Raffo is most famous for her notable role in the one-woman play 9 Parts of Desire. The play focuses on the lives of women in her father's homeland, and was originally conceived in 1993 after a visit to her Iraqi relatives. It was also inspired by Raffo's trip to the Saddam Art Centre in Baghdad where she saw only billboard sized portraits of Saddam Hussein. Later, in a back room, she saw a painting of a nude woman clinging to a barren tree. She took a photo of the painting, returned to America and devised a way of replicating the painting into a play. A decade later she completed the play, which features monologues by nine highly distinct Iraqi women, all played by herself.

When asked about 9 Parts of Desire, she comments  "I'd love to hear an American say, 'That Bedouin woman is just like my aunt.' But at the same time, I want American audiences to walk out a little confused, not able to say, 'Oh, I get it,' but rather to understand how difficult it is to grasp the psyche of people who have lived under Saddam for 30 years with American support, then had a war with Iran, resulting in 1.5 million deaths, followed by 13 years of sanctions and two wars under American firepower." 

The response to the play drew much media attention to Heather, as she has given numerous public appearances and interviews on American television shows.  She has also spoken to the National Press Club, as well as featuring in O: The Oprah Magazine as part of her "Aha Moment". With such major success in London, Los Angeles, New York, Seattle, Chicago, Philadelphia and Washington DC, 9 Parts of Desire is currently being translated for international productions in France, Brazil and Turkey. On July 18, 2008, she recreated some of her monologues from "9 Parts of Desire" at the New York Open Center and shared what she has learned from what John Lahr in The New Yorker called "an example of how art can remake the world." In May 2013, 9 Parts of Desire was performed for the first time in Iraq by students from The American University of Iraq – Sulaimani, with Heather in the audience.

Heather has also been approached by International press about doing stories on her show, but she refused as she did not want to draw attention to her family in Iraq, as it could lead to dangerous circumstances.  
 
Heather is also one of the six participating writers for the play The Middle East, In Pieces, a play which displays the current developments in the Middle East and addresses the conflicts in Lebanon, Israel and Iraq.

Her other acting credits include, playing Sarah Woodruff in the world premiere of The French Lieutenant's Woman performed at the Fulton Opera House.  The off-Broadway, Over the River and Through the Woods, the off Broadway/National Tour of Macbeth where she played Lady Macbeth, The Merry Wives of Windsor as Mistress Page and The Rivals all with The Acting Company. Regionally in theatre productions of the following, Othello, Romeo and Juliet, As You Like It, Macbeth, and The Comedy of Errors all with The Old Globe Theatre in San Diego.

She has performed in the play In Darfur by Winter Miller at New Yorks Public Theatre, revealing the depth of the crisis in Darfur, Sudan. The play was made to raise awareness of the ongoing genocide in Darfur and help encourage activism.

She wrote the libretto for Tobin Stokes' opera Fallujah, based on the Second Battle of Fallujah.

Her play Noura opened at Playwrights Horizons on December 10, 2018.

Filmography
 Vino Veritas
 9 Parts of Desire
 In Darfur
 The Middle East, In Pieces

Awards
 Susan Smith Blackburn Prize Special Commendation
 Marian Seldes-Garson Kanin Fellowship for 9 Parts of Desire.
 Lucille Lortel Award (2005) for Outstanding Solo Show

Nominations
 Outer Critics Circle Nomination
 Drama League nomination for Outstanding Performance

References

External links
Official Site
Interview by Simi Horwitz (Archive)
Article by Curt Holman

Videos
Interview with Al Jazeera English's Riz Khan
Interview on This is America
Interview on Women to Women

American people of Iraqi-Assyrian descent
Year of birth missing (living people)
University of Michigan alumni
University of San Diego alumni
Living people
American women writers
Actresses from Michigan
Writers from Michigan
People from Okemos, Michigan
Catholics from Michigan
American dramatists and playwrights
21st-century American women writers